Okpik or Ookpik, the Inuit language word for a snowy owl, may refer to:

Ookpik, an Inuit handcrafted toy resembling an owl
Okpik, a cold-weather adventure program created by the Boy Scouts of America
Okpik's Dream, a Canadian documentary film, released in 2015
Abe Okpik, an Inuit community leader in Canada, who worked to replace disc numbers with surnames
dg nanouk okpik, an Alaskan Iñupiaq poet